Bruunshaab Gamle Papfabrik (Bruunshaab Old Cardboard Factory) is a former textile and cardboard factory located in the town Bruunshåb, a few kilometers south of Viborg, Denmark. It was built as a textile factory by manufacturer Bertel Bruun in 1821. His sons Peter Daniel Bruun and Mads Pagh Bruun later took over the factory. The latter established the cloth mill Ny Bruunshaab at Aarhus.

After a large fire in the early 1900s, a new main building was built in 1909, designed by architect . In 1919, the factory was adapted for cardboard production. All production ended in the late 1960s.

The buildings have been protected since 1999. The factory has been a working museum since 1986.

References

External links

 

Pulp and paper mills
Defunct manufacturing companies of Denmark
Manufacturing companies established in 1821
Danish companies established in 1821
Companies based in Viborg Municipality
Museums established in 1986